Trevor Charles Bosworth Stamp, 4th Baron Stamp, FRCP (18 September 1935 – 20 October 2022) was a British medical doctor and hereditary peer.  He was consultant physician and director of the Department of Bone and Mineral Metabolism, Institute of Orthopaedics, at the Royal National Orthopaedic Hospital, 1974–1999, and has been honorary consultant physician (retired) since then.  He succeeded his father Trevor Stamp, 3rd Baron Stamp as Baron Stamp in 1987.  The House of Lords Act 1999 removed the right of hereditary peers to sit in the House of Lords. 

Stamp married twice
 Anne Carolynn Churchill, with whom he had two children, Hon. Catherine Stamp and Hon. Emma Stamp
 Carol Anne Russell, with whom he had two children, Hon. Lucinda Stamp and Nicholas Charles Trevor, 5th Baron Stamp.

Stamp died on 20 October 2022, at the age of 87.

References

Sources
 ‘STAMP’, Who's Who 2012, A & C Black, 2012; online edn, Oxford University Press, Dec 2011; online edn, Nov 2011       accessed 23 Feb 2012
 http://www.debretts.co.uk/people/biographies/browse/s/3621/Trevor%20Charles%20Bosworth%20Stamp+STAMP.aspx

1935 births
2022 deaths
20th-century British medical doctors
Barons in the Peerage of the United Kingdom
Fellows of the Royal College of Physicians

Stamp